PWA may refer to:

Aviation
 Wiley Post Airport (IATA airport code), Oklahoma City, Oklahoma, U.S.
 Pacific Western Airlines

Computing
 Pirates with Attitudes, a warez release group
 Picasa Web Albums
 Progressive web app
 Project Web Access, later renamed Project Web App, a component of Microsoft Project Server

Organizations
 Provincial Waterworks Authority, a Thai state water supply company
 Public Works Administration, the construction agency of the US New Deal program
 Patients' Welfare Association in Karachi, Pakistan 
 Progressive Writers' Association, in pre-partition India
 The Polytechnic of Western Australia

Sports
 Professional Windsurfers Association; see Windsurfing
 Prairie Wrestling Alliance, a Canadian professional wrestling promotion based in Edmonton
 Reality of Wrestling or Pro Wrestling Alliance, a US independent professional wrestling promotion
 Pro Wrestling America, a defunct independent professional wrestling promotion
 Pure Wrestling Association, a Canadian professional wrestling promotion; see Melissa Maughn

Other uses
 People With AIDS, an initialism
 People with albinism, an initialism
 Portuguese West Africa, now Angola
 Partial wave analysis, a technique in quantum mechanics

See also
 Pro Wrestling Women's Alliance